Peter David Shore, Baron Shore of Stepney,  (20 May 1924 – 24 September 2001) was a British Labour Party politician and former Cabinet Minister, noted in part for his opposition to the United Kingdom's entry into the European Economic Community. His idiosyncratic left-wing nationalism led to comparison with the French politician Jean-Pierre Chevènement. He was described in an obituary by the Conservative journalist Patrick Cosgrave as "Between Harold Wilson and Tony Blair, the only possible Labour Party leader of whom a Conservative leader had cause to walk in fear" and, along with Enoch Powell, "the most captivating rhetorician of the age".

Early life
Born in Great Yarmouth, Norfolk, Shore was the son of a Merchant Navy captain and was brought up in a middle-class environment. He attended Quarry Bank High School in Liverpool and, from there, went to King's College, Cambridge, to read History as an exhibitioner, where he was a member of the Cambridge Apostles, a secret society with an elite membership. During the later stages of World War II he served in the Royal Air Force, spending most of his time in India.

Political career
He had specialised in political economy during part of his degree and joined the Labour Party in 1948. He spent the 1950s working for the party and, after two unsuccessful Parliamentary contests at St Ives in 1950 and Halifax in 1959, he was appointed as Head of the Labour Party's Research Department and took charge of the renewal of party policy following its third successive defeat in 1959. Shore was only briefly a follower of Hugh Gaitskell; his adherence to the Campaign for Nuclear Disarmament from 1958 led to a breach in relations for several years.

He became close to Harold Wilson after Wilson had been elected as party leader, and was the main author of the Labour Party manifesto for the 1964 general election. At the last minute, he was selected to fight the safe seat of Stepney in the election, which he easily won.

After only a short spell on the backbenches, Wilson chose Shore to be Parliamentary Private Secretary, responsible for liaising between the Prime Minister and Labour MPs, though Denis Healey termed him "Harold's lapdog". Shore was responsible for drafting the 1966 and 1970 election manifestos. Shore's job as Wilson's PPS kept them in close contact and in August 1967, Shore became a member of the Cabinet as Secretary of State for Economic Affairs.

In government
This Department had been created by Wilson to undertake long-term planning of the economy. Shore declared immediately his belief in state-controlled economic planning, together with the regulation of prices and wages. Early in 1968, the responsibility for prices and incomes was transferred to another department. The Treasury had never approved of the creation of the Department for Economic Affairs and began reasserting its influence, depriving it of any significant power. The Department was wound up in October 1969. At the same time, Shore sided with those in cabinet who were opposed to Barbara Castle's White Paper, In Place of Strife. In a conversation with Richard Crossman at the time, Wilson was frustrated with Shore: "I over-promoted him. He's no good".

Shore was retained in the Cabinet as a Minister without Portfolio and Deputy Leader of the House of Commons. He played a key part, behind the scenes, in planning the Labour Party's unsuccessful 1970 general election campaign. In opposition, Shore was appointed as spokesman on Europe, taking the lead in opposing Edward Heath's application to join the European Economic Community. Shore had already become convinced that membership of the EEC would be a disaster because it would stop the British government from taking necessary economic action. However, due to organisation by pro-EEC Labour backbenchers, Heath was able to steer his policy successfully through Parliament.

EEC
When Wilson returned to government in 1974, Shore was appointed as Secretary of State for Trade. His term in office was dominated by the renegotiation of the terms of British membership of the EEC, a pledge contained in the Labour manifesto as a preparation for a national referendum on membership; this compromise had reunited the Labour Party on the issue. Shore participated in the discussions without believing that any new terms would be acceptable, and during the referendum he joined with other anti-EEC politicians in opposing membership.

The results of the 1975 Referendum, giving a two-to-one majority in favour of remaining a member of the EEC, damaged Shore along with the other 'dissenting ministers'. His inclination to support an autarkic economy ruled him out of consideration as a new Chancellor of the Exchequer, but Shore was moved to Secretary of State for the Environment by new Prime Minister James Callaghan in 1976. This move was a promotion but involved him in considerable political controversy. He called on local authorities to cut spending and waste, and criticised the trade unions representing local authority staff for failure to support modernisation. Shore also launched a campaign to revitalise the inner cities of Britain.

Nuclear deterrent
Shore became a fervent advocate of the British nuclear deterrent for the last three decades of his life, but in 1958 he had been an active member of CND. In his 1966 book Entitled to Know, he was critical of the Nassau Agreement with the United States under which Britain's nuclear submarines were, except in a national emergency, permanently assigned to NATO. Regarding dependence on NATO as limiting Britain's freedom of action, Shore negatively compared Britain's nuclear strategy to that of France:

Shore had always been implacably opposed to any suggestion of British participation in the Vietnam war, both as PPS and in Cabinet he had encouraged Wilson to distance himself more explicitly from American foreign policy. By the mid-1970s, while continuing to condemn American foreign policy in Vietnam and Chile, he had become more supportive of NATO and the United States.

Labour leadership candidate
When the Labour Party went into opposition in 1979, Shore was made Shadow Foreign Secretary, having recanted on his previous support for CND. He was persuaded to stand as a candidate in the election of a new party leader in November 1980 by Michael Foot who thought he was the best-placed soft-left candidate to defeat Denis Healey. However, Shore came bottom of the poll with 32 votes when Foot was himself persuaded to stand. Foot then made him Shadow Chancellor where his support for interventionist measures met with Foot's approval; party policy also became opposed to EEC membership, which suited Shore well. In the early 1980s, Shore's patriotic tendencies were again evident when he first of all strongly opposed the Conservative Government's attempts to hand over the Falkland Islands to Argentina, then supported Margaret Thatcher over the Falklands War of 1982.

Shadow Cabinet
He fought for the leadership again after Foot resigned, but obtained a dismal vote of 3%, being unsupported by any Constituency Labour Party. Shore served as Shadow Leader of the House of Commons for four years under Neil Kinnock but his influence with the leadership was negligible and he was not re-elected to the Shadow cabinet in 1985. He stood down from the front bench in 1987 and thereafter served on the Foreign Affairs Select Committee, devoting himself to European Union questions. Edward Pearce wrote in his Guardian obituary of Shore that "he had now become a right-wing figure, cluckingly approved of by Conservatives".

Tony Blair selected him as a senior Labour statesman as his nominee for the Committee on Standards in Public Life when it was set up in 1994.

Backbenches, retirement and death
After several attempts in his constituency party to deselect him, he finally stood down from the House of Commons at the 1997 general election, and in the dissolution honours he was made a life peer, being created Baron Shore of Stepney, of Stepney in the London Borough of Tower Hamlets on 5 June 1997. His book Separate Ways (2000) advocated a multi-speed Europe, with some countries as merely associate members, so as to allow the centre to forge a political union at its own pace. He died in 2001, aged 77.

Family 
On 27 September 1948, Shore married Dr Elizabeth Catherine Wrong, daughter of the historian Edward Murray Wrong. Known as Liz, she was the Deputy Chief Medical Officer of England from 1977 to 1985, and in this role and later positions she championed women's career progression in medicine. They had two daughters, Thomasina and Tacy, both retired teachers, and two sons, Crispin, who is Professor of Social Anthropology at Goldsmiths, University of London, and Piers, who died in 1977. Elizabeth Catherine Wrong Shore died in 2022.

References

Bibliography
Entitled to Know, MacGibbon & Kee (1966) 
Europe: the way back, Fabian Society (1973)
Leading the Left, Weidenfeld & Nicolson (1993) 
Separate Ways, Duckworth (2000)

Archives
 Catalogue of the Shore papers at the Archives Division of the London School of Economics.

External links 

|-

|-

|-

|-

|-

|-

|-

|-

|-

|-

|-

|-

|-

|-

1924 births
2001 deaths
Alumni of King's College, Cambridge
British Secretaries of State for the Environment
Labour Party (UK) life peers
Labour Party (UK) MPs for English constituencies
Members of the Privy Council of the United Kingdom
People educated at Quarry Bank High School
Politicians from Liverpool
Transport and General Workers' Union-sponsored MPs
UK MPs 1964–1966
UK MPs 1966–1970
UK MPs 1970–1974
UK MPs 1974
UK MPs 1974–1979
UK MPs 1979–1983
UK MPs 1983–1987
UK MPs 1987–1992
UK MPs 1992–1997
Parliamentary Private Secretaries to the Prime Minister
People from Great Yarmouth
Chairs of the Fabian Society
Presidents of the Board of Trade
Ministers in the Wilson governments, 1964–1970
Royal Air Force personnel of World War II
Shadow Chancellors of the Exchequer
Life peers created by Elizabeth II
British Eurosceptics